The European Credit Research Institute (ECRI) provides analysis and insight into the structure, evolution and regulation of retail financial services markets in Europe. Through its research activities, publications and conferences, ECRI keeps its members and the wider public up-to-date on a variety of topics, such as retail financial services, credit reporting and consumer protection at the European level.

ECRI is an independent, non-profit research institute that develops its expertise from an interdisciplinary team and networks of academic cooperation partners. It was founded in 1999 by a consortium of European banking and financial institutions. ECRI's operations and staff are managed by the Centre for European Policy Studies (CEPS).

Principal activities

Research
 ECRI Research Reports present analyses of issues affecting retail financial services in the member states of the European Union.
 ECRI Policy Briefs give overviews of ongoing regulatory or policy initiatives impacting the European retail financial services landscape.
 ECRI Commentaries provide insights and views on the EU retail financial services market and regulatory developments.
 ECRI Statistical Packages offer an annually updated dataset that presents statistical information on credit to households.
 ECRI Databases hold systematically compiled data on regulations and legislation in the area of banking and credit, credit reporting and data protection.
 ECRI participates in large-scale research projects in cooperation with other international researchers and research institutions. ECRI has also conducted research for the European Commission and the World Bank.

Conferences
ECRI seminars and workshops debate emerging policy questions and provide a platform for an open exchange of views among policy-makers, academics, industry representatives and consumer associations.

ECRI website
The Institute's website offers ECRI news, publications and policy monitoring. Different sections on events, research projects and a categorised library keep visitors updated about developments in Europe. ECRI members have access to a restricted area featuring special databases and documents.

Newsletter
ECRI News provides information about past, current and upcoming regulatory developments in the European market for retail financial services, ongoing and planned ECRI research projects and other activities of the Institute.

ECRI Network
ECRI has a vast interacts with a broad network of cooperation partners, including the World Bank, DIW Berlin, the Personal Finance Research Centre in the United Kingdom and the European Savings Institute in France. ECRI is a founding member of the Consumer Finance Network, a research network composed of academics from nine different countries across Europe.

ECRI members 
A number of banks and specialized credit companies, a credit bureau and a credit management service company are members of ECRI and represented in the institute's Executive Committee, presided by Dr. Rosa-Maria Gelpi:
 BNP Paribas Personal Finance
 Citibank Belgium
 Cofinoga
 Cofidis
 Findomestic Banca
 Grupo BBVA
 International Personal Finance
 Intrum Justitia
 Provident Financial
 RCI Banque
 Schufa Holding AG
 Sofinco
 Visa Europe

References

Think tanks established in 2011
Political and economic think tanks based in the European Union
Research institutes in Belgium